Tommy Hardin (born January 6, 1962) is an American politician who served in the Oklahoma House of Representatives from the 49th district from 2010 to 2022. He will retire from office after the 2022 elections due to term limits.

References

1962 births
Living people
Republican Party members of the Oklahoma House of Representatives
21st-century American politicians